John Carr (12 January 1924 – 18 December 1990) was a Scottish footballer who played as a winger.

Career
Prior to playing senior football, Carr played at junior level at Kirkintilloch Rob Roy and St Roch's.

Carr played senior football for Clyde (during World War II) and Alloa Athletic in Scotland, before signing for Gillingham in June 1948. On 1 September 1948, Carr made his debut for Gillingham in a 5–0 away win against Dartford. Carr scored 12 goals in each of his Southern League seasons with Gillingham, remaining with the club as they won re-election to the Football League in 1950. In his final season at the club, Carr scored two goals in 11 Football League appearances, before signing for Chelmsford City in August 1951.

References

1924 births
1990 deaths
Association football wingers
Scottish footballers
Sportspeople from Bishopbriggs
Scottish Junior Football Association players
Kirkintilloch Rob Roy F.C. players
St Roch's F.C. players
Clyde F.C. players
Alloa Athletic F.C. players
Gillingham F.C. players
Chelmsford City F.C. players
Scottish Football League players
Southern Football League players
English Football League players